Odessa Pittard Bailey (1906–1994) was a civic leader and judge in Virginia.  She was appointed to the Roanoke Juvenile and Domestic Relations Court in 1944, making her the first woman in Virginia to hold a judicial post higher than justice of the peace or county trial justice. Bailey co-founded the Virginia Council of Juvenile Court Judges and served as its president from 1947 to 1948. She served as president of the Virginia Federation of Women’s Clubs.

References 

American judges

20th-century American women judges
20th-century American judges
1906 births
1994 deaths

Women in law
American women